The Pullinque Lake is one of the "Seven Lakes" in Panguipulli municipality, southern Chile. The lake is of glacial origin and lies between Calafquén and Panguipulli Lake. Pullinque Hydroelectric Plant is located near the southwestern outflow of the lake.

Lakes of Los Ríos Region
Lakes of Chile
Glacial lakes of Chile